The King Long Kairui (厦门金龙-凯锐浩克) is a commercial and light passenger van capable of seating up to 10 passengers produced by the Chinese manufacturer King Long starting from 2018.

Overview

The King Long Kairui was launched in 2018 with prices ranging from 71,800 to 160,000 yuan. Despite being a front-engined model, parts on the rear half of the King Long Kairui after the B-pillars were shared with the cab-forward King Long Kaige.
Styling is controversial as just like the King Long Kaige, the rear half of the vehicle heavily resembles the Toyota Hiace, while the front fascia of the vehicle is heavily inspired by the Volkswagen Transporter T6.

Powertrain
The King Long Kairui is powered by a 2.0 liter turbo engine developing 215hp and 282N·m and a 2.2 liter naturally aspirated engine developing 112hp and 198N·m. Gearbox options include a 5-speed manual transmission and a 6-speed manual transmission.

References

External links
http://www.kinglongvan.com.cn/vehicle_2.html - King Long Kairui official site.

2010s cars
Cars introduced in 2018
Rear-wheel-drive vehicles
Minivans
Vans
Minibuses
Vehicles introduced in 2018
Kairui